The German word  may refer to:

 The Piano Sonata No. 29 in B flat major, Op. 106 by Ludwig van Beethoven
 A German word for early pianos
 A novel by Yasmina Reza